Imre Bujdosó (born 12 February 1959, in Berettyóújfalu, Hajdú-Bihar County) is a Hungarian fencer, who has won two Olympic medals in the team sabre competition.

References

1959 births
Living people
Hungarian male sabre fencers
Fencers at the 1988 Summer Olympics
Fencers at the 1992 Summer Olympics
Olympic fencers of Hungary
Olympic medalists in fencing
Olympic gold medalists for Hungary
Olympic silver medalists for Hungary
Medalists at the 1988 Summer Olympics
Medalists at the 1992 Summer Olympics